Ne Zha, also spelled Nezha, is a 2019 Chinese 3D computer animation fantasy adventure film directed and written by Yu Yang, credited as Jiaozi. Its animation production is done by the director's own Chengdu Coco Cartoon. Featuring the popular Chinese mythological character Nezha, the plot is loosely based on the classic 16th-century novel Investiture of the Gods, attributed to Xu Zhonglin.

It was released in China exclusively in IMAX and China Film Giant Screen theatres on 13 July 2019, followed by other theatres on 26 July, distributed by Beijing Enlight Pictures. It is the first Chinese-produced animated feature released in IMAX format, and, despite being the debut feature of its director and animation studio, and having no widely known actors in its voice cast, it has been one of the biggest commercial successes in Chinese cinema, setting numerous records for box-office grosses: as of August 2019, the film is the highest-grossing animated film in China, the worldwide highest-grossing non-U.S. animated film, and the second worldwide highest-grossing non-English-language film of all time at the time of its release. With a gross of over $725 million, it was that year's fourth-highest-grossing animated film, and China's all time third-highest-grossing film.

It began a North American release on 29 August 2019 in select IMAX 3D theatres, before a nationwide rollout on 6 September. It was selected as the Chinese entry for Best International Feature Film at the 92nd Academy Awards, becoming the first animated film from China to ever do so, but it was not nominated.

A second film set in the same universe, titled Legend of Deification, was released on 1 October 2020, which is National Day in China.

Plot 
A Chaos Pearl, birthed from primordial essences, begins siphoning energies gluttonously. Yuanshi Tianzun dispatches his disciples Taiyi Zhenren and Shen Gongbao to subdue the sentient pearl. Due to its ability to absorb energy, Taiyi and Shen are unable to gain the upper hand. Eventually Tianzun separates the pearl into two opposite components: the Spirit Pearl and the Demon Orb. Tianzun places a heavenly curse upon the Demon Orb: in three years time it will be destroyed by a powerful lightning strike. Tianzun then instructs Taiyi to take the Spirit Pearl to be reincarnated as the third son of Li Jing in the town of Chentangguan, to be named Ne Zha.

Shen conspires to steal the Spirit Pearl and causes the Demon Orb to be placed on the ritual altar instead, causing Li Jing's pregnant wife Lady Yin to give birth to a child, Ne Zha, whose demonic nature is apparent. Taiyi tells them that Ne Zha's fate is sealed: in three years' time the heavenly curse placed upon the Demonic Orb will kill him regardless. Li travels to Heaven with Taiyi in an attempt to plead for Ne Zha's life, but is told the curse is irremovable.

Meanwhile, Shen has brought the stolen Spirit Pearl to the Dragon King. The dragons resent their role as jailers of the Heavenly Court and being confined to a hellish existence on the ocean floor, so the Dragon King infuses the Spirit Pearl into an egg, giving birth to a son, Ao Bing, whom the Dragon King allows Shen to take as a student. It is hoped that through the blessed nature of a dragon born from the Spirit Pearl that dragon kind will be deemed worthy by Heaven, allowing for the ascendance of dragons and other beings in similar positions.

To tame his demonic nature and make him happy, Ne Zha's parents lie to him, telling him he was born of the Spirit Pearl and is destined to be a great demon hunter. Ne Zha studies under Taiyi and acquires great skills. Eventually becoming impatient, the impetuous Ne Zha escapes his confines to hunt demons. While chasing a water demon, he burns down a fishing village. His fight against the demon is joined by Ao Bing, who is eventually defeated, but Ne Zha cleverly overcomes the demon and rescues both Ao Bing and a little girl, and he and Ao Bing become friends. Nevertheless, he is misunderstood by the townsfolk of the destroyed village, and angerly lashes out at the villagers, hurting many of them.

The Li household organizes a lavish birthday party for their son, inviting a nervous town to attend. Shen visits Ne Zha before the party, revealing the truth of his nature to him. Angry and upset, Ne Zha unleashes his true demonic form and nearly kills his father until Ao Bing intervenes. Feeling betrayed, Ne Zha leaves to await his fate.

Li discovers Ao Bing has the Spirit Pearl, and knowing if this is revealed to Tianzun then not only will he be punished, all of dragon kind will be condemned forever, and not wanting to betray his kind, Ao Bing acts on Shen's recommendation of removing all witnesses by burying the town alive under a massive sheet of ice. Meanwhile, Ne Zha learns that while visiting Heaven to plead for his life, his father accepted an enchantment that would allow him to trade his life for Ne Zha's. Moved by his father's sacrifice, Ne Zha returns to the village to stop Ao Bing. Eventually unleashing his full demonic form, Ne Zha defeats Ao Bing, but spares his life for being his only friend.

When the heavenly lightning approaches, Ne Zha surrenders to his fate but is unexpectedly joined by Ao Bing. Linking hands, they unleash the Chaos Pearl's ability to absorb energy. Their mortal bodies prove too weak to contain the full energy of the strike and are destroyed, but with Taiyi's help, they survive by becoming spirits, and the townsfolk kneel before them.

In the mid and post credits scenes, the Dragon King vows vengeance on the citizens of Chentangguan for what happened to Ao Bing, while in an unknown location, Jiang Ziya is introduced.

Voice cast

Mandarin Chinese 
 Lü Yanting as the child Nezha, son of Li Jing and Lady Yin
 Joseph (囧森瑟夫) as the adolescent Nezha
 Han Mo as Ao Bing, the Dragon King's third son
 Chen Hao as Li Jing, Nezha's father and the chief who governs Chentangguan. He becomes a noble father willing to sacrifice his own life to rescue his son Nezha
 Lü Qi as Lady Yin, Nezha's mother and the chieftess who also governs Chentangguan.
 Zhang Jiaming as Taiyi Zhenren, Nezha's master, a Taoist immortal who lives on the Kunlun.
 Yang Wei as Shen Gongbao, Taiyi's brother and Ao Bing's master

English 
 Jordan Cole as Ne Zha
 Griffin Puatu as adolescent Ne Zha
 Aleks Le as Ao Bing
 Vincent Rodriguez III as Li Jing
 Stephanie Sheh as Lady Yin 
 Mike Pollock as Taiyi Zhenren
 Jaden Waldman as Shen Gongbao

Production

Inspiration 
The film tells the mythological origins of Nezha, who is a protection deity in Chinese folk religion, and its story is loosely based on the literary version of the myth that forms two chapters of Investiture of the Gods, a Ming-dynasty shenmo novel, traditionally attributed to Xu Zhonglin, which incorporates various existing myths into a wider narrative.

The story has been adapted for the screen many times before, at least as early as 1927 or 1928, whether on its own (as in the 1979 traditionally-animated film Nezha Conquers the Dragon King) or as part of adaptations of the whole of Investiture of the Gods (such as the 2016 live-action film League of Gods).

Pre-production 

Director Jiaozi spent two years in total to write the screenplay, and the film was in production for three years.

Animation production 

The film has more than 1,318 special effects shots, and it took over 20 Chinese special effects studios, employing more than 1,600 people, to realize the film's fairy tale setting, the mysterious Dragon King's Palace, and a complex fight between fire and water. One scene alone took two months to complete.

Release

Domestic 

Executive production company and distributor Beijing Enlight Pictures premiered Ne Zha on 11 July 2019 in Beijing, followed by an encore on 12 July. The film was given a limited release in IMAX and China Film Giant Screen premium large format theatres on 13 July, and was released nationwide on 26 July.

Box office 

The film grossed 600 million yuan (est. $84 million) in its first three days alone. It broke local records with a $91.5 million opening, the highest ever for an animated film in China.

On August 2, 2019, It became the highest-grossing animated film of all time in China, a record held by Zootopia ($235.6 million) since 2016. On 7 August 2019, Ne Zha became the fastest animated film to reach $400 million (in 12 days). It is currently the highest-grossing animated film of all time in a single market ($703.71 million in China) overtaking Incredibles 2 (2018) ($608.5 million in North America), the highest-grossing non-Disney or Pixar animated film in a single market, overtaking Shrek 2 (2004) ($441.2 million in North America), and the highest-grossing non-English spoken animated film, overtaking Spirited Away (2001) ($361.1 million worldwide). Upon reaching $700 million (in 46 days), it became the first ever animated feature film in film history to reach that milestone in a single market.

International 

The film was released in cinemas in English-speaking regions in Mandarin with English subtitles around the end of August and beginning of September 2019.

It was released in Australia on 23 August and in New Zealand on 29 August, distributed by CMC Pictures.

It was released in the United States and Canada in select IMAX 3D venues on 29 August, followed by other cinemas on 6 September, distributed by Well Go USA Entertainment.

It was released in the United Kingdom and Ireland, including in select IMAX 3D venues, on 30 August, distributed by CMC Pictures in collaboration with Cine Asia.

Reception 

Douban, a Chinese media rating site, gave the film 8.7 out of 10.

On Metacritic, the film has a weighted average score of 54 out of 100 based on 5 critics, indicating "mixed or average reviews".

Future
The creative team behind the film has announced that Ne Zha will be the first installment in a fictional universe based on the stories told in the Fengshen Yanyi. The next film in the franchise was announced to be Legend of Deification, featuring Jiang Ziya. It was slated for release on 25 January 2020 in China, but following the COVID-19 pandemic, all Chinese New Year releases were cancelled. It was released on the 1st of October 2020, which aligned with China's national day, in both China and the U.S.

See also
 List of submissions to the 92nd Academy Awards for Best International Feature Film
 List of Chinese submissions for the Academy Award for Best International Feature Film

References

External links 

 
 
 
 
 
 
 
 

2019 computer-animated films
2019 films
2010s fantasy adventure films
Chinese 3D films
Chinese computer-animated films
Chinese fantasy films
Demons in film
Films based on Chinese myths and legends
Films based on Chinese novels
2010s Mandarin-language films
IMAX films
Works based on Investiture of the Gods
Animated feature films